Service Force, United States Pacific Fleet, usually known as COMSERVPAC, was a service support command of the United States Pacific Fleet from 1942 until 1973. It was the reincarnation of the former Base Force. The Service Force comprised the supply train of the fleet which includes Oilers (AO), Gasoline Tanker (AOG), Repair Ships (AR), Ammunition Ships (AE), Destroyer Tenders (AD) and Submarine tenders (AS).

Service forces under the ComServPac were known as ServPac or SERVPAC.

From 1942, the early Service Force was organized around four squadrons: Two, Four, Six, and Eight. Squadron Two included hospital ships, fleet motion-picture exchange, repair ships, salvage ships, and tugs. Squadron Four had the transports and the responsibility for training. This was the tiny nucleus of what eventually became the great Amphibious Force, or Forces. Squadron Six took care of all target-practice firing and of the towing of targets, both surface and aerial. Six also controlled the Fleet Camera Party, Target Repair Base, Anti-Aircraft School, Fleet Machine Gun School, and Small Craft Disbursing. Squadron Eight had the responsibility for the supply and distribution to the fleet of all its fuels, food, and ammunition. Growth and changes came. In March 1942 the name was changed to Service Forces Pacific Fleet.

In 1973 cruisers, destroyers, amphibious ships, mine warfare vessels, and service ships in the Pacific Fleet all came under the command of Commander, Naval Surface Force Pacific. The ships of the modern day equivalent of the service force have gradually transferred from Naval Surface Force Pacific to the Military Sealift Command's Naval Fleet Auxiliary Force.
In 1984, Service Group 1 and Service Squadron 3 on the West Coast had a total of fifteen ships assigned (2 AFS, 2 AOE, 3 AOR, 1 AR, 7 AE). In addition, Service Squadron 5 at Pearl Harbor had another 2 ARS and 2 ATS. By 1987, Service Squadron 3 had been disestablished and there were a total of fourteen service ships on the West Coast, plus five more in Service Squadron 5. By 2012, the Military Balance listed 5 Sacramento class fast combat support ships and Supply-class oilers (AOE) in regular U.S. Navy service, but 42 vessels in the Naval Fleet Auxiliary Force.

Commanders
Former Commanders, Base Force, Pacific Fleet
 Rear Admiral William L. Calhoun USN (December 1939 – 27 February 1942)

Former Commanders, Service Force, Pacific Fleet
 Vice Admiral William L. Calhoun USN(27 February 1942 – 6 March 1945)
 Vice Admiral William W. Smith   USN    (6 March 1945 – 2 September 1945)
 Rear Admiral Francis C. Denebrink   USN   (1949–1953)
 Rear Admiral W.D. Irvin             USN   (1963–1965)
 Rear Admiral Edwin B. Hooper        USN   (1965–1968)
 Rear Admiral Walter V. Combs        USN   (1968)
 Vice Admiral John M. Barrett        USN   (1969–1971)

References

Further reading
 Hyperwar Naval Chronology 
 History of United States Naval Operations in World War II

External links 
 ServPac

ServPac
Military logistics units and formations of the United States
Military units and formations established in 1942
Military units and formations disestablished in 1973
Military logistics units and formations of the United States Navy